Demodex microti is a hair follicle mite from the skin of the genital area of the common vole, Microtus arvalis.

References

Trombidiformes
Animals described in 2013